The Broncho Kid is a 1920 American short silent Western film directed by Mack V. Wright and featuring Hoot Gibson.

Cast
 Hoot Gibson
 Yvette Mitchell
 Dudley Hendricks credited as D.C. Hendricks
 Jim Corey

See also
 List of American films of 1920
 Hoot Gibson filmography

External links
 

1920 films
1920 Western (genre) films
1920 short films
American silent short films
American black-and-white films
Films directed by Mack V. Wright
Silent American Western (genre) films
1920s American films